Tomáš Klíma (born June 13, 1990) is a Slovak professional ice hockey centre currently playing for HC 21 Prešov of the Slovak Extraliga.

He is the twin brother of Lukáš Klíma and the nephew of former NHL player Petr Klíma.

Career
Klíma made his professional debut with HK Dukla Trenčín of the Tipsport Liga during the 2009–10 season. He then joined HC Karlovy Vary in the Czech Extraliga on October 26, 2010, alongside his twin brother Lukáš.

Career statistics

Regular season and playoffs

References

External links

1990 births
Living people
Czech ice hockey centres
HC 07 Detva players
HK Dukla Trenčín players
HC Karlovy Vary players
HC Košice players
MHC Martin players
HC Most players
Sportovní Klub Kadaň players
HKM Zvolen players
HC 21 Prešov players
People from Ilava
Sportspeople from the Trenčín Region
Slovak ice hockey centres
Slovak people of Czech descent